The Dos de Mayo Province (literally May 2) is one of eleven provinces of the Huánuco Region in Peru. The capital of this province is the city of La Unión.

Boundaries
North: Huamalíes Province
East: Leoncio Prado Province
South: Huánuco Province,  Yarowilca Province and Lauricocha Province
West: Ancash Region

Geography 
Some of the highest mountains of the province are listed below:

Political division
The province is divided into nine districts, which are:

 Chuquis
 La Unión
 Marías
 Pachas
 Quivilla
 Ripán
 Shunqui
 Sillapata
 Yanas

Ethnic groups 
The province is inhabited by indigenous citizens of Quechua descent. Spanish, however, is the language which the majority of the population (59.82%) learnt to speak in childhood, 39.87% of the residents started speaking using the Quechua language (2007 Peru Census).

See also 
 Qiwllaqucha
 Huánuco Pampa

References 

Provinces of the Huánuco Region